Face of a Fugitive is a 1959 American Western film directed by Paul Wendkos. It stars Fred MacMurray, Lin McCarthy, Myrna Fahey, James Coburn and Dorothy Green and was based on the short story "Long Gone" by Peter Dawson, the pen name of Jonathan H. Glidden (older brother of Luke Short). Dawson was the author of 120 Western short stories and novelettes as well as 15 book length Western serials. The working title was Justice Ends with a Gun.

Plot

Bank robber Jim Larsen is handcuffed to Deputy Marshal George Allison on his way to begin a 5–to-10-year prison sentence. Without animosity, Larsen says he will use his time in prison to plan more robberies. Larsen feels  he was only caught by using a partner; the next time will be singlehanded. Boarding the train, Larsen overpowers the deputy, takes his pistol and handcuffs him to the rear car of the train. Larsen's younger brother Danny comes to free Larsen, who chides Danny that he does not need help from anyone.

Danny has brought Jim a horse and they flee. The deputy produces a hidden derringer from an ankle holster, aiming at them. He mortally wounds Danny, who kills the deputy. The two board another train by hiding in the baggage car. Jim explains his escape plans to Danny en route, but Danny dies. Jim places his brother's corpse in a mail sack, throws it off a bridge passing over a river and vows to be alone in the future.

The train's first stop is the Enterprize Mine  where Jim changes into his father's business suit which Danny brought, and Jim reboards the train as a passenger. The only vacant seat is next to Alice a six-year-old girl who has been visiting her grandfather, an employee at the Enterprise mine. The talkative Alice guesses that since she does not recognise Jim, he must be a visiting mining inspector. Using the name Ray Kincaid, Larsen plays along with her guess and gathers information on the next town, Tangle Blue, Wyoming.

Mark Riley, an earnest but inexperienced sheriff who is young Alice's uncle, and a group of deputies stop the train to search for the deputy's murderer by asking for passengers' identification; they are satisfied with "Ray Kincaid the mining inspector" due to his travelling with Alice. The deputies say that a wanted poster for their deputy's killer (which will have Jim Larsen's face on it) will be arriving on the next day's train and everyone will be checked entering or leaving the town.

Larsen/Kincaid arrives in town, meeting Alice's mother, the widow Ellen Bailey. Uncle Mark is having problems with rich landowner Reed Williams fencing off government land open range which he has claimed as his for many years.

Larsen/Kincaid uses his remaining money to have a shave then buy a horse and tack, a set of work clothes, and a pistol, belt and ammunition to replace the pistol he threw away during the search on the train. Larsen/Kincaid finds all the roads away from Tangle Blue are guarded by deputies who are preventing anyone leave the town until the wanted posters come in. Returning to town and desperate for cash, he  decides to earn some money as being a deputy for Mark.

Larsen/Kincaid attends a dance with Ellen who says she wants to leave Tangle Blue. He proves his ability as a lawman by preventing a showdown between Williams' gang and Mark. Escorting Ellen and Alice home, they pass some deputies who have discovered Danny's unidentified body in the sack that the river has brought to town. Though Larsen/Kincaid tries to avoid getting involved with Ellen, they fall in love.

As part of his duties in enforcing the law, Mark cuts down Williams' barbed wire fences, that Williams' men rebuild. Sheriff Mark reminds Larsen/Kincaid of Danny, and Mark is being threatened by Williams who says he will kill Mark if he cuts down the fence one more time. Returning to town to drink, Williams and his gang menace Larsen/Kincaid who responds by beating up Williams in a fair fight, but Larsen/Kincaid is then worked over by Williams' gang working together.

The next day Larsen/Kincaid is the only deputy willing to go with Mark to cut down Williams' fence. They go to an area overlooking the fence and find it unrepaired; Mark prepares to go back to meet the train with the wanted posters, which would leave Larsen/Kincaid free to leave town by the very road he was supposed to guard.

But then Purdy, one of Williams' hired men, arrives at the fence and repairs it. When Mark discovers this he comes back to cut it again. Purdy draws a gun and is about to shoot Mark when Larsen/Kincaid see this from the overlook and chooses not to escape the town but instead to go help Mark. Using a rifle, he disarms Purdy, and then also shoots the barbed wire which snaps back and tangles around Purdy. Mark goes on to meet the train, leaving Larsen/Kincaid to slowly untangle the wire around Purdy.

Soon Williams and several more of his men arrive and immediately shoot at Larsen/Kincaid who escapes on horseback back to town. Pursued by them, he tries to defend himself from the roof of a boarded-up house on a main street. After killing several of the men but getting wounded, he falls through the rotted roof, landing next to an old bed losing his gun and injuring his leg, he struggles to crawl downstairs, getting to the stairs' landing; Williams begins to break through one of the boarded-up doors from the street.  Purdy, the last of Williams' men, jumps down from the hole in the roof and makes it to the top of the dark stairway just as Williams finally gets the door open and immediately shoots the figure in the dark, killing Purdy.

As the dead man falls down the stairway, Larsen/Kincaid retrieves the man's gun and uses it to kill Williams.

When Mark and others finally arrive at the scene, one of the men looks at the wounded and unconscious Larsen/Kincaid, then at the wanted poster he is holding, and says, "He's the man we're after alright."  Mark then says, "Well maybe, maybe not", as they carefully take him to a doctor; Mark states that he will testify for Larsen/Kincaid at his trial.

Cast

Production
The film was shot at the Bell Moving Picture Ranch, Corriganville (the ghost town) and on the Sierra Railroad. It also features an early film score by the prolific composer Jerry Goldsmith (credited as Jerrald Goldsmith).

See also
 List of American films of 1959

References

External links
 
 
 
 

1959 films
Columbia Pictures films
American Western (genre) films
1959 Western (genre) films
Films based on short fiction
Films directed by Paul Wendkos
Films scored by Jerry Goldsmith
Revisionist Western (genre) films
1950s English-language films
1950s American films